Ozhiski Lake is a lake in northern Kenora District, Ontario, Canada.

This name is probably from Ojibwa ajishki 'mud, dirt, mire' (Baraga 1880), azhashki 'mud' (Nichols and Nyholm 1979).

See also
List of lakes in Ontario

References
 National Resources Canada

Lakes of Kenora District